Piero Magni (Genoa, December 22, 1898 - April 17, 1988) was an Italian aeronautical engineer.  He was heavily involved with the National Advisory Committee for Aeronautics later in his career.

Magni contributed to the development of variable incidence and canard wings. His activity has not been limited to the design, becoming also an entrepreneur, establishing a firm initially dealing with the manufacture under license of gliders, and then taking charge of the audit of aircraft for the Regia Aeronautica. He designed the Vittoria 1924 sport plane.

He succeeded also in manufacturing some designs, and patented a cowling to be applied on a radial engine that allowed to remarkably increase the aircraft aerodynamics penetration and allowing at the same time an efficient system of temperature regulation of the aircraft itself. This project, known as Anello Magni, has been further developed by the National Advisory Committee for Aeronautics, becoming known as NACA cowling.

References

1898 births
1988 deaths
Engineers from Genoa
History of aviation
20th-century Italian engineers